The Cuinarana Marine Extractive Reserve is a coastal marine extractive reserve in the state of Pará, Brazil.

Location
 
The Cuinarana Marine Extractive Reserve is in the municipality of Magalhães Barata, Pará.
The reserve protects the mangroves between the east bank of the Marapanim River and the west bank of the Cuinarana River.
The Mestre Lucindo Marine Extractive Reserve lies to the west and the Maracanã Marine Extractive Reserve lies to the east.

History

The Cuinarana Marine Extractive Reserve was created by federal decree on 10 October 2014.
The reserve is one of three created by president Dilma Rousseff thirteen days before the 2014 presidential elections.
The other two are the Mocapajuba and Mestre Lucindo marine extractive reserves, both also in Pará.

The reserve is administered by the Chico Mendes Institute for Biodiversity Conservation (ICMBio).
It is classed as IUCN protected area category VI (protected area with sustainable use of natural resources).
The objective is to conserve the biodiversity of the ecosystems of mangroves, salt marshes, dunes, wetlands, floodplains, rivers, estuaries and islands; and to protect the livelihoods and culture of the traditional extractive population, and ensure the sustainable use of natural resources of the unit.

Notes

Sources

Marine extractive reserves of Brazil
Protected areas of Pará
2014 establishments in Brazil
Protected areas established in 2014